Cool Spot is a 1993 platform game developed and published by Virgin Games for the Mega Drive/Genesis and Super Nintendo Entertainment System. The game was ported by other teams to Master System, Game Gear, Game Boy, Amiga, and MS-DOS in 1994. The title character is Cool Spot, a mascot for the soft drink brand 7 Up. Cool Spot's appearance in his own video game came at a time when other brand mascots (like Chester Cheetah and the Noid) were appearing in their own video games.

Gameplay

Cool Spot is a single-player platform game in which the player controls the title character. Cool Spot can jump and can attack by throwing soda bubbles in any direction. Cool Spot can also cling to and climb various things by jumping up in front of them. In each level the player must rescue other cool spots, who look exactly alike, from their cages. In order to do so, the player is required to collect a certain number of "spots" that changes (usually increasing) as the game progresses. "Spots" are placed around the level in large quantities. The player's health is monitored by a humorous Cool Spot face that gradually bends forward and eventually falls from its position as damage occurs. Damage is taken by touching enemies and their projectiles and certain other obstacles. There is also a time limit for each level. The game has no save feature but does include checkpoints in the form of flagpoles.

If the player successfully collects enough Spots to enter the Bonus Stage after defeating a level, it is possible to collect Continues by grabbing a letter hidden within the stage. Depending on the version of the game, all letters either spell "UNCOLA" (7 Up's slogan), or "VIRGIN" (the game's developer). If a Continue letter is collected, Spot will be able to restart on the level he was on at the time of losing his last life, although his total points will be reset.

Regional differences
In the European release, the 7 Up bottle was removed from the intro and replaced by a generic soda bottle of similar color. The decision was made to avoid associating the 7 Up Spot with the 7 Up brand, in a region where Fido Dido has been considered the brand's official mascot since the 1980s.

Reception

Pelit gave it a score of 82%, and summarized it as "one of the most enjoyable platform games in a long time".

Accolades

Cool Spot was ranked 88th on Complex's 'Best Super Nintendo Games of All Time' list, which praised the game for being a 'pretty enjoyable platformer' despite blatant product placement. In 1995, Total! rated the game 65th on its Top 100 SNES Games writing: "The game that Dave Perry really showed his talents off with. Not deep, but a great laugh." In the same year, MegaZone included Cool Spot in their Top 50 Games In History. They praised the game calling it a "Gorgeous platformer" and praised the animation. In 1996, GamesMaster listed the Mega Drive version  92nd in their "Top 100 Games of All Time." also in 1996, Super Play named Cool Spot 100th on its Top 100 SNES Games of All Time. They also praised the game’s graphics concluding: "One of the few non-Mario platformers worth anything more then a passing glance."

Legacy
While Cool Spot was a side-scrolling platform game, its sequel, Spot Goes to Hollywood, was more 3D in orientation and featured gameplay inside various movies. Despite excellent visuals, its isometric perspective and unusual controls made it an exceedingly difficult game. This game, published once again by Virgin Interactive, was developed by Eurocom. It was released for Mega Drive/Genesis in 1995, Sega Saturn in 1996, and Sony PlayStation in 1997, with the 32-bit versions featuring revamped graphics and different levels than those of the Mega Drive/Genesis version, and being developed by Burst Studios instead of Eurocom.

See also
 Spot: The Video Game
 Spot: The Cool Adventure

References

1993 video games
Advergames
Works based on advertisements
Amiga games
Drink advertising characters
DOS games
Game Boy games
Game Gear games
Platform games
Master System games
Sega Genesis games
Super Nintendo Entertainment System games
Video games developed in the United States
Virgin Interactive games
Video games about food and drink
Video game characters introduced in 1987
Mascots introduced in 1987
Video games scored by Mark Cooksey
Video games scored by Matt Furniss
Video games scored by Tommy Tallarico
Single-player video games
NMS Software games